Ainsworth may refer to:

Places
Canada
Ainsworth Hot Springs, British Columbia
United Kingdom
Ainsworth, Greater Manchester, England
United States
Ainsworth, Indiana
Ainsworth, Iowa
Ainsworth, Nebraska
Ainsworth, Wisconsin
Ainsworth, Washington, ghost town
Ainsworth State Park, Oregon

People
Ainsworth (surname)

Ships
 City of Ainsworth, a pioneer sternwheeler from British Columbia; its deep-water wreck is a heritage site

Other uses 
 Ainsworth baronets